Alaimidae is a family of nematodes belonging to the order Dorylaimida.

Genera

Genera:
 Adorus Thorne, 1939
 Alaimus de Man, 1880
 Amphidelus Thorne, 1939

References

Nematodes